Naught is the second full-length album by Stolen Babies. Named by Rani Sharone, bassist for Stolen Babies, Naught represents hopelessness: all for naught. This album is darker than the prior album, There Be Squabbles Ahead. Many of the songs on Naught hit close to home for many of the members of Stolen Babies, and is a representation of their experiences at that time. The album was released on September 18, 2012 in digital download format and on October 16, 2012 in CD format through No Comment Records. On September 17, 2012, the album was made available for streaming on SoundCloud and Shockya.com. Naught was voted #1 in Revolver's "Album of the Week" readers poll on October 22, 2012 and #7 in The Village Voice Blog's "Ten Best Metal Albums of 2012" by Linda Leseman.

Track listing
Naught album track listing adapted from Allmusic.

Personnel
Naught album personnel adapted from the CD liner notes and Allmusic.

Stolen Babies
Dominique Lenore Persi - lead vocals, accordion, piano (track 7), keyboards (11)
Rani Sharone - bass, guitars, vocals, upright bass (tracks 7, 13), mandolin (8), banjo (8, 13), toy piano (8), programming, percussion
Gil Sharone - drums, percussion
Ben Rico - keyboards, percussion, vocals

Additional musicians
Michael Iago Mellender - additional background vocals (tracks 4, 7, 11) trumpet (8) guitar & keyboards (7, 11) toy piano & typewriter banjo (7) 
Darling Freakhead - additional background vocals & guitar (track 11)
Meredith Yayanos - violin (track 4)
Brian Walsh - clarinet (tracks 4,8) bass clarinet (8) 
Patrick Surace - bugle
Marz Richards -background vocals

Production
Ulrich Wild - production, mixing, engineer
Raider - mixing and recording assistant
Stolen Babies - production (tracks 4, 7, 11, 13)
Michael Iago Mellender - production (tracks 7, 11)
Kevin Majorino - mixing, engineer, mastering at AMP Studios

References

External links

2012 albums
Stolen Babies albums
Albums produced by Ulrich Wild